Nikita Rafalovich (born 10 October 1993) is an Uzbekistani taekwondo athlete.

Career
Rafalovich represented Uzbekistan at the 2016 Summer Olympics in Rio de Janeiro, in the men's 80 kg. He qualified to represent Uzbekistan at the 2020 Summer Olympics in the men's 80 kg category.

Personal life
Rafalovich was born in Tashkent on 10 October 1993.

References

External links

 

1993 births
Living people
Uzbekistani male taekwondo practitioners
Olympic taekwondo practitioners of Uzbekistan
Taekwondo practitioners at the 2016 Summer Olympics
Asian Games gold medalists for Uzbekistan
Asian Games silver medalists for Uzbekistan
Asian Games medalists in taekwondo
Taekwondo practitioners at the 2014 Asian Games
Taekwondo practitioners at the 2018 Asian Games
Medalists at the 2014 Asian Games
Medalists at the 2018 Asian Games
World Taekwondo Championships medalists
Asian Taekwondo Championships medalists
Taekwondo practitioners at the 2020 Summer Olympics
21st-century Uzbekistani people